Jonas Björkman and Todd Woodbridge were the defending champions but lost in the second round to František Čermák and Leoš Friedl.

Mahesh Bhupathi and Max Mirnyi won in the final 6–4, 3–6, 7–6(8–6) against Michaël Llodra and Fabrice Santoro.

Seeds
All eight seeded teams received byes to the second round.

Draw

Finals

Top half

Bottom half

External links
 2003 Monte Carlo Masters Doubles Draw

2003 Monte Carlo Masters
Doubles